The Teratorn T/A is an American ultralight aircraft that was designed and produced by Teratorn Aircraft. The aircraft was supplied as a kit for amateur construction.

Design and development
The first design by Teratorn Aircraft was known simply as the Teratorn, named after the extinct ice-age soaring bird. The company took its name from the first design. This design quickly evolved into the T/A model and was produced until supplanted in production by the Tierra I.

It features a cable-braced high-wing, a single-seat, open cockpit, conventional landing gear and a single engine in pusher configuration.

Both the Teratorn and the T/A are made from bolted-together aluminum tubing, with the flying surfaces covered in Dacron sailcloth. Its single-surface  span wing is supported by cables attached to a simple kingpost. The landing gear is bungee suspended. Both models were supplied with the  Rotax 277 single cylinder, two-stroke powerplant as their standard engine.

The T/A model proved a commercial success and a large number were sold. The Skye Treck Skyseeker was based on the T/A.

Variants
Teratorn
Simple motorglider with a sling seat, utilizing weight shift for pitch control and rudder and spoilers for roll control, both cable-actuated by movement of the sling seat. Empty weight , gross weight , cruise speed , stall speed , glide ratio 8:1.
T/A
Ultralight aircraft with a fixed seat and three-axis aerodynamic controls, with spoilers for roll control.

Specifications (T/A)

References

External links
Photo of a Teratorn T/A landing

1970s United States ultralight aircraft
Homebuilt aircraft
Single-engined pusher aircraft
Teratorn Aircraft aircraft